Hand-in-cap is an old English trading game and the term itself is the origin of the modern word handicap. In this game, two players want to trade possessions.  An umpire decides whether the items have the same value, and if not, what the difference is.  Both players and the umpire then put some forfeit money in a cap.  The players put their hands in the cap, and then remove them either open, to signal agreement with the valuation, or closed, to signal disagreement. If both players agree, the difference in valuation is paid, the items are traded, and the umpire collects the forfeit. If both players disagree, the items are not traded, and the umpire collects the forfeit. If one player agrees and the other does not, the items are not traded, and the player who agreed to the valuation collects the forfeit.

History
This game was played in Piers Plowman, a poem from the 14th century. The concept of a neutral person evening up the odds was extended to handicap racing in the mid-18th century.  In handicap racing, horses carry different weights based on the umpire's estimation of what would make them run equally.  The use of the term to describe a person with a disability—by extension from handicap racing, a person carrying a heavier burden than normal—appeared in the early 20th century.

References

English games
Games of chance